Donna Elise Chisholm (born 9 June 1957) is a New Zealand investigative journalist and author.

Career 
Chisholm was the first female chief reporter at the Auckland Star newspaper. Former New Zealand Listener editor Jenny Wheeler has called her the most "outstanding health reporter New Zealand's ever seen." She is best known for her campaign in the Sunday Star-Times to free David Dougherty from prison for a rape he did not commit. Dougherty was subsequently exonerated and awarded $868,728 in compensation. Chisholm's six-year investigation was dramatised in the 2009 Television New Zealand film Until Proven Innocent, and recounted in the 2017 book A Moral Truth: 150 years of investigative journalism in New Zealand by James Hollings.

Chisholm is the author of the book From the Heart, a biography of the heart surgeon Brian Barratt-Boyes.

She lives in Auckland, and was formerly the editor-at-large for monthly current affairs magazine North & South, and senior writer for the weekly New Zealand Listener.

Awards 
2000: New Zealand Qantas Media Awards Newspaper Feature Writer of the Year
2004: New Zealand Qantas Media Awards Newspaper Feature Writer of the Year
2011: Canon Media Awards Magazine Feature Writer of the Year: the Helen Paske Trophy
2016: Canon Media Awards Science and Technology Feature Writing award
2017: Outstanding achievement award at the 2017 Voyager Media Awards
2018: Voyager Media Awards Science and Technology Award, joint winner

References 

1957 births
Living people
New Zealand journalists
New Zealand women journalists
New Zealand investigative journalists
New Zealand biographers
Women biographers